Radl Pass, with an elevation of , is a mountain pass in the Alps, located on the border between Austria and Slovenia in the Bundesland of Styria.

The pass road begins in the municipality of Lieboch and crosses the A 2 Autobahn. It is used heavily by industrial traffic.

See also
 List of highest paved roads in Europe
 List of mountain passes

References 

Mountain passes of Slovenia
Mountain passes of the Alps
Mountain passes of Styria
Austria–Slovenia border crossings